Jessica Matten is a Canadian actress and producer.

Career

In 2018, Matten appeared in Season 3 of Discovery Canada and Netflix's TV show Frontier starring Jason Momoa. Also in 2018, she began appearing in the CW Network and CBC drama Burden of Truth. 

In 2020, Matten began starring in Tribal on the APTN Network.  She plays the newly appointed chief of an indigenous police force in Alberta, Canada. Also in 2020, Matten appeared in the horror movie The Empty Man for Disney/20th Century Fox studios.

In 2022, Matten co-starred in Robert Redford, George R.R. Martin (Game of Thrones) and Graham Roland's produced Dark Winds television series opposite Zahn McClarnon and Kiowa Gordon for the AMC Network.

Matten is the President of 7 Forward Entertainment, an Indigenous-owned production company based out on the West Coast of Canada. She is also a Co-Founder of The Counting Coup Indigenous Film Academy (“CCIFA”), an educational environment for creative work, where emerging and aspiring First Nations, Metis and Inuit artists can gain expertise and experience in film.

Personal life
Matten was born in Edmonton, Alberta.

Matten is of Red River Métis and Saulteaux-Cree heritage through her mother. Since the age of 6, she assisted with her mother's First Nations modeling agency around Canada. She also worked for her father in marketing for several years before becoming an actor. 

Matten graduated from the University of Alberta with a science degree in Human Ecology.

Partial filmography

References

Living people
Actresses from Edmonton
Canadian television actresses
Canadian Métis people
University of Alberta alumni
Saulteaux people
Cree people
First Nations actresses
21st-century Canadian actresses
Year of birth missing (living people)